Bies is a surname. Notable people with the surname include:

 Don Bies (born 1937), American golfer
 Garey Bies (born 1946), American politician
 Jean Biès (1933–2014), French philosopher and poet
 Rauno Bies (born 1961), Finnish sport shooter
 Susan Bies (born 1947), American banker

See also